Hellinsia rigidus is a moth of the family Pterophoridae. It is found in North America, including California.

References

rigidus
Moths of North America
Fauna of California
Moths described in 1938